The 2019 FIM Moto3 World Championship was a part of the 71st F.I.M. Road Racing World Championship season.

This class and Moto2 adopted the qualifying format used by MotoGP for the season, in which the riders that placed 15th or lower on combined times in the third free practice session would be admitted to qualifying 1, then the four fastest riders from that session would join the fastest 14 riders in qualifying 2.

Teams and riders

All the bikes used series-specified Dunlop tyres.

Team changes
 Marinelli Snipers Team expanded to two bikes again after the team's withdrawal from Moto2.
 Max Biaggi's team, Max Racing Team, made its World Championship debut after he signed a partnership deal with Peter Öttl's race team, Südmetal Schedl GP Racing.

Rider changes
Philipp Öttl moved up to Moto2 with Red Bull KTM Tech3.
Both Fabio Di Giannantonio and Jorge Martín moved up to Moto2, joining Speed Up Racing and Red Bull KTM Ajo respectively.
Raúl Fernández made his full season debut with Ángel Nieto Team, replacing Andrea Migno who moved to Bester Capital Dubai.
Filip Salač made his full season debut with Redox PrüstelGP as a teammate of Jakub Kornfeil, replacing Marco Bezzecchi who moved up to Moto2 with Red Bull KTM Tech3.
Celestino Vietti made his full season debut with Sky Racing Team VR46, replacing Nicolò Bulega who moved up to Moto2 with the same team.
Makar Yurchenko returned to Moto3 with BOE Skull Rider Mugen Race.
John McPhee left CIP Green Power to join Petronas Sprinta Racing, replacing Adam Norrodin who moved to the CEV Moto2 European Championship with the same team.
Marcos Ramírez left Bester Capital Dubai to join Leopard Racing, replacing Enea Bastianini who moved up to Moto2 with Italtrans Racing Team.
Sergio García made his full season debut with Estrella Galicia 0,0, replacing Arón Canet who moved to Max Racing Team.
Ai Ogura made his full season debut with Honda Team Asia, replacing Nakarin Atiratphuvapat.
Gabriel Rodrigo left RBA Racing Team and joined Gresini Racing alongside rookie Riccardo Rossi.
Romano Fenati returned to Moto3 with VNE Snipers after one season in Moto2 after his contract with Forward Racing was terminated following the controversial incident at the 2018 San Marino Grand Prix with Stefano Manzi.
Can Öncü made his full season debut with Red Bull KTM Ajo, replacing Darryn Binder who moved to CIP Green Power. Öncü was allowed to race despite being below the minimum age of 16 as he received a special dispensation by Dorna after winning the 2018 Red Bull MotoGP Rookies Cup.
Tom Booth-Amos made his full season debut with CIP Green Power.

In-season changes
Ryusei Yamanaka replaced Sergio García for the first race due to age restriction.
Vicente Pérez was dropped due to poor results and replaced by Stefano Nepa from the Dutch TT onwards.

Calendar
The following Grands Prix took place during the season:

 ‡ = Night race

Results and standings

Grands Prix

Riders' standings
Scoring system
Points were awarded to the top fifteen finishers. A rider had to finish the race to earn points.

Constructors' standings
Scoring system
Points were awarded to the top fifteen finishers. A rider had to finish the race to earn points.

 Each constructor got the same number of points as their best placed rider in each race.

Teams' standings
The teams' standings were based on results obtained by regular and substitute riders; wild-card entries were ineligible.

Notes

References

Moto3
Grand Prix motorcycle racing seasons